Cumberland East was a provincial electoral district in Nova Scotia, Canada, that elected one member of the Nova Scotia House of Assembly. It existed from 1949 to 1993. It was formed in 1949 when Cumberland County was divided into three new districts, the other two being Cumberland Centre and Cumberland West.

Members of the Legislative Assembly
This electoral district elected the following Members of the Legislative Assembly:

Election results

1949 general election

1953 general election

1956 general election

1960 general election

1963 general election

1967 general election

1970 general election

1974 general election

1978 general election

1981 general election

1984 general election

1988 general election

References
Election Summary From 1867 - 2007
1993 Poll by Poll Results
1988 Poll by Poll Results
1984 Poll by Poll Results
1981 Poll by Poll Results
1978 Poll by Poll Results
1974 Poll by Poll Results
1970 Poll by Poll Results
1967 Poll by Poll Results

Former provincial electoral districts of Nova Scotia